Concord Township is one of sixteen townships in Elkhart County, Indiana. As of the 2000 census, its population was 54,167.

History
Concord Township was founded in 1830.

The Joseph and Sarah Puterbaugh Farm was listed on the National Register of Historic Places in 1995.

Geography

Cities and towns
 Dunlap
 Elkhart (south half)
 Goshen (northwest edge)

Unincorporated towns
 De Camp Gardens
 Midway
(This list is based on USGS data and may include former settlements.)

Adjacent townships
 Osolo Township (north)
 Washington Township (northeast)
 Jefferson Township (east)
 Elkhart Township (southeast)
 Harrison Township (south)
 Olive Township (southwest)
 Baugo Township (west)
 Cleveland Township (northwest)

Major highways

Cemeteries
The township contains five cemeteries: Burkett, Grace Lawn, Prairie Street, Rice, Rowe and Frame.

References
 
 United States Census Bureau cartographic boundary files

External links

 Indiana Township Association
 United Township Association of Indiana

Townships in Elkhart County, Indiana
Townships in Indiana
1830 establishments in Indiana
Populated places established in 1830